"Kwarantined Krab" is the second segment of the 263rd episode of SpongeBob SquarePants, airing as part of the show's twelfth season. It was originally scheduled to air in the United States in 2020, but the events of COVID-19 caused it to be withheld from airing on Nickelodeon until April 29, 2022 (making it the final episode of the twelfth season to air), due to the episode's plot revolving around a pandemic.

Plot
A health inspector walks into the Krusty Krab, where he declares that there is a disease called the "Clam Flu" spreading around, causing most of the characters to run around and panic. The health inspector orders the restaurant to be put under quarantine, much to the dismay of Squidward and Pearl. The Krusty Krab is locked down with SpongeBob, Patrick, Squidward, Mr. Krabs, Pearl, and Mrs. Puff stuck inside. Krabs suggests locking the diseased person inside the freezer once they are found. Some pepper is accidentally launched into the air, causing SpongeBob to sneeze, making everyone else assume he has caught the disease. SpongeBob willingly walks into the freezer after being asked. Patrick notices SpongeBob having fun in the freezer, so he pretends that he has caught the Clam Flu too, causing him to be thrown inside.

After Squidward itches his arm, Pearl assumes that he has caught the disease; Mr. Krabs then throws him into the freezer. Mr. Krabs notices that Mrs. Puff has yawned, making him think that she has caught the Clam Flu too; she is also locked in the freezer. After Pearl remembers that she has some money left over from last time she was in the mall, Mr. Krabs believes her mind is poisoned from the disease, locking her up as well. Mrs. Puff states that Mr. Krabs himself is the one that has caught the disease; she and the rest of the characters break out of the freezer. The characters chase Mr. Krabs around the restaurant, but all end up incapacitated in doing so. When the health inspector returns, he says that he made a mistake, and that no one is actually sick, before assuming that everyone has caught a different disease, with Mr. Krabs catching all of them; He orders the Krusty Krab in an even stronger lockdown. The restaurant is transported onto the Chum Bucket, where Plankton begs everyone to stay away from him to avoid catching the disease, before realizing that he may have already caught it.

Production
TBA

Reception and controversy
David King at Bubble Blabber gave the episode a positive review, and notes that the humor comes from the paranoia between the characters; King states "as they're quarantined from disease yet the synopsis itself slowly, makes it obvious near the end with a very ironic ending."

"Kwarantined Krab" was initially meant to air during 2020, but was pulled until April 29, 2022, due to the plot revolving around a pandemic, as the real-world pandemic known as COVID-19 was first detected near the end of 2019. Due to this, it is not available to watch on Paramount+ with the other episodes, nor included on the show's Season 12 DVD set. However, it is available to purchase on iTunes and Amazon Prime. Regarding the pulling of the episode, as well as the third-season episode, "Mid-Life Crustacean", Michelle Mehrtens at Screen Rant commented "Considering the fact that SpongeBob SquarePants is specifically geared toward children, it is understandable that Nickelodeon would be hesitant to keep these episodes in their digital rotation. At the same time, the show exists in a compelling televisual spectrum, one that balances between the consumption of children and adults."

References

External links
 

2020 American television episodes
2022 American television episodes
Animation controversies in television
SpongeBob SquarePants episodes
Self-censorship
Television controversies in the United States
Television episodes about influenza outbreaks
Television productions postponed due to the COVID-19 pandemic
Television episodes pulled from general rotation
Impact of the COVID-19 pandemic on television